Footballer's ankle is a pinching or impingement of the ligaments or tendons of the ankle between the bones, particularly the talus and tibia. This results in pain, inflammation and swelling.

Causes 
A common cause of anterior impingement is a bone spur on anklebone (talus) or the shinbone (tibia). Repeated kicking actions can cause the anklebone to hit the bottom of the shinbone, which can lead to a lump of bone (or bone spur) developing. This bone spur may then begin to impact on the soft tissue at the front of the ankle, causing inflammation and swelling. The condition is most common in athletes who repeatedly bend the ankle upward (dorsiflexion), such as footballers, hence the name.

Symptoms 
Pain and tenderness over anterior ankle joint
Pain on dorsiflexion and plantar flexion
Band of pain across anterior ankle when kicking a ball
Palpable bony lump on distal tibia or superior talus

Treatment 
Soft tissue techniques to stretch muscles crossing the ankle to relieve tension
Mobilisation of ankle joint
Steroid injection to reduce inflammation
Surgery to remove bony spurs

External links
Simon Moyes: Anterior Impingement (Footballer's Ankle)

Ankle
Ankle
Ankle
Ankle
Ankle
Sports injuries